St. John the Evangelist Roman Catholic Church may refer to:

 St. John the Evangelist Roman Catholic Church (Baltimore, Maryland), listed on the National Register of Historic Places in Baltimore, Maryland
 St. John the Evangelist Roman Catholic Church (Lithium, Missouri)
 St. John the Evangelist Roman Catholic Church (Zigzag, Oregon), listed on the National Register of Historic Places in Clackamas County, Oregon